Grateful Dawg is the soundtrack to the 2000 film of the same name. It is a collaboration between Jerry Garcia and David Grisman. It was released on the Acoustic Disc record label.

Track listing 
"Intro"
"Grateful Dawg (Live)"
"Wayfaring Stranger" - Bill Monroe And His Blue Grass Boys
"Sweet Sunny South"
"Old and in the Way Intro" - Peter Rowan
"Pig In A Pen" - Old & In the Way
"Dawg's Waltz"
"Sitting Here in Limbo"
"Off to Sea Once More" - Ewan MacColl
"Off to Sea Once More"
"Jenny Jenkins"
"Arabia"
"The Thrill Is Gone"
"Friend of the Devil"
"Grateful Dawg (studio)"

Personnel
Joe Craven – percussion, violin
Jerry Garcia – arranger, banjo, guitar, vocals
David Grisman – arranger, banjo, mandola, mandolin, vocals
Jim Kerwin – bass, acoustic bass

Production:
David Dennison – engineer, mixing
David Gahr – photography
D. Brent Hauseman  – design, layout design
Nobuharu Komoriya – photography	
Craig Miller – executive producer
Susana Millman – photography
Gary Nichols – photography
Jon Sievert – photography
Owsley Stanley – engineer
Paul Stubblebine – mastering

References

David Grisman albums
Documentary film soundtracks
Jerry Garcia soundtracks
Collaborative albums
2001 soundtrack albums
Acoustic Disc soundtracks